Grabovac is a settlement in the region of Baranja in Croatia. It is in Čeminac municipality in Osijek-Baranja County. In 2011 its population was 872.

References 

Populated places in Osijek-Baranja County
Baranya (region)